RAF kinases are a family of three serine/threonine-specific protein kinases that are related to retroviral oncogenes. The mouse sarcoma virus 3611 contains a RAF kinase-related oncogene that enhances fibrosarcoma induction.  RAF is an acronym for  Rapidly Accelerated Fibrosarcoma.

RAF kinases participate in the RAS-RAF-MEK-ERK signal transduction cascade, also referred to as the mitogen-activated protein kinase (MAPK) cascade. Activation of RAF kinases requires interaction with RAS-GTPases.

The three RAF kinase family members are:
 A-RAF
 B-RAF
 c-Raf

References 

EC 2.7.11